West is a surname.

Notable people with the name include:
 Absolom M. West (1818–1894), American politician, and Confederate militia general
 Adam West (1928–2017), American actor
 Adam West (soccer) (born 1986), American soccer player
 Alan West (footballer) (born 1951), English footballer
 Alan West, Baron West of Spithead (born 1948), Royal Navy admirals and British peer
 Allen West (disambiguation), several people
 Andrew West (disambiguation), also Andy West, several people
 Anita West (born 1935), British actress and former television presenter
 Anthony West (disambiguation), several people
 Barbara West (1911–2007), English Titanic survivor
 Barbara West (TV news anchor) (born 1948), American journalist
 Belford West (1896-1973), American football player
 Benjamin West (disambiguation), also Ben West, several people
 Billy West (born 1952), American voice actor
 Billy West (baseball) (1853–1928), American baseball player
 Billy West (silent film actor) (1892–1975), American actor
 Bob West (born 1956), American voice actor
 Bob West (radio host) (1942–2016), American ethnomusicologist and radio host
 Brian West (disambiguation), several people
 Catherine West (born 1966), English politician
 Chandra West (born 1970), Canadian actress
 Charcandrick West (born 1991), American football player
 Charles West (disambiguation), several people
 Chester H. West (1888–1935), American Medal of Honor recipient
 Colin West (born 1962), English football player and coach
 Colin West (author) (born 1951), English children book writer and illustrator 
 Colin West (footballer, born 1967), English football player
 Corinne West (born 1970), American singer-songwriter
 Corinne Michelle West (1908–1991), American painter
 Cornel West (born 1953), American philosopher, political activist, and writer
 David West (disambiguation), several people
 Debi Mae West (born 1964), American voice actor
 Delonte West (born 1983), American basketball player
 Dominic West (born 1969), English actor
 Don West (educator) (1906–1992), American educator
 Don West (wrestling) (born 1963), American professional wrestling commentator
 Donald J. West (1924–2020), British psychiatrist
 Dorian West (born 1967), English rugby footballer
 Dorothy West (1907–1998), American writer
 Dorothy West (actress) (1891–1980), American actress
 Dottie West (1932–1991), American country music singer and songwriter
 Earl Irvin West (1920–2011), American church historian
 Edward West (1782–1828), British economist
 Edward Nason West (1909–1990), American Episcopal priest
 Edward William West (1824-1905), British Indologist
 Emilie West (1844–1907), Danish schoolteacher, proponent of needlework
 Florence Duval West (1840–1881), American poet
 Francis West (disambiguation), several people
 Frederick West (disambiguation), also Fred West, several people
 George West (disambiguation), several people
 Gilbert West (1703–1756), English poet
 Gladys West (born 1930), American mathematician
 Gordon West (1943–2012), English footballer
 Gordon West (cricketer) (1923–2002), English cricketer
 Graeme West (born 1953), New Zealand rugby league footballer and coach
 Graham West (born 1973), Australian politician
 Harry West (1917–2004), Irish politician
 Harry West (musician), American musician
 Henry West (disambiguation), several people
 Hershell West, American basketball player and coach
 James West (disambiguation), several people
 Jane West (1758–1852), British writer and poet
 Jane West (campaigner), American cannabis activist
 Jerry West (born 1938), American basketball player and executive
 Jerry West (author), pseudonym of Andrew E. Svenson (1910–1975), American writer
 Jessamyn West (librarian) (born 1968), American librarian and activist
 Jessamyn West (writer) (1902–1984), American author
 Jim West (disambiguation), several people
 Joseph West (disambiguation), also Joe West, several people
 John West (disambiguation), several people
 Josh West (born 1977), British-American Olympic rower and earth scientist
 Josh West (politician) (born 1976), American politician
 Julian West, stage name of Nicolas de Gunzburg (1904–1981), French-American editor and bon-vivant 
 Kanye West (born 1977), American record producer and rapper
 Kit West (1936–2016), British special effects artist
 Kimber West (born 1974), Playboy Playmate 
 Lee Roy West (1929–2020), American judge
 Leslie West (1945–2020), American musician, member of the rock band Mountain, and the trio West, Bruce and Laing
 Leslie West (cricketer) (1905–1982), English cricketer
 Lizzie West (born 1973), American singer-songwriter
 Louis Jolyon West (1924–1999), American psychiatrist
 Madeleine West (born 1980), Australian actress
 Mae West (1893–1980), American actress and screenwriter
 Margaret West (1903–1963), American heiress, vaudeville performer and radio hostess
 Margaretta Sully West (died 1810), American theater manager and stage actor
 Mark West (disambiguation), several people
 Martin West (disambiguation), several people
 Mary West (born 1945/1946), American entrepreneur and philanthropist
 Mary Allen West (1837–1892), American journalist, editor, educator
 Matt West (baseball) (born 1988), American baseball player
 Matthew West (born 1977), American musician
 Matthew West (politician) (1801–1880), American politician
 Maura West (born 1972), American actress
 Michael West (disambiguation), several people
 Michelle Sagara West (born 1963), Japanese-Canadian author
 Mike West (swimmer) (born 1964), Canadian swimmer
 Morris West (1916–1999), Australian writer
 Nathan West (born 1978), American actor and musician
 Nathanael West (1903–1940), American novelist and playwright
 Nathaniel West (captain) (–1723), Virginia colonial legislator
 Nicholas West (1461–1533), English bishop and diplomatist
 Nick West (disambiguation), several people
 Nigel West, pen-name of Rupert Allason (born 1951), British writer and politician
 Nina West (born 1978), American drag queen
 Oswald West (1873–1960), American politician
 Owen West (born 1969), American military officer and official
 Owen B. West (1869–1948), American politician, businessman, and farmer
 Paula West (born 1959), American jazz and cabaret singer
 Paul West (disambiguation), several people
 Pennerton West (1913–1965), American artist
 Peter West (1920–2003), British TV presenter and sports commentator
 Peter West (footballer) (1931–2010), Australian rules footballer
 Peter West (physicist) (born 1951), British physicist
 Randy West (disambiguation), several people
 Rebecca West (1892–1983), British-Irish writer
 Red West (1936–2017), American actor, film stuntman and songwriter
 Reginald West, 6th Baron De La Warr (1395–1450), English noble
 Richard West (disambiguation), several people
 Robert West (disambiguation), several people
 Rosemary West (born 1953), British serial killer
 Samuel West (disambiguation), also Sam West, several people
 Sandra Márjá West (born 1990), Norwegian Sami politician and festival manager of Riddu Riđđu
 Scott West (born 1974), Australian rules footballer
 Shane West (born 1978), American actor
 Speedy West (1924–2003), American pedal steel guitarist and record producer 
Spencer West (born 1981), American motivational speaker and disability advocate 
 Stewart West (born 1934), Australian politician
 Stu West (born 1964), English musician
 Stuart West, British evolutionary biologist
 T. J. West (fl. early 20th C), Australian cinema entrepreneur in Adelaide, South Australia
 Taribo West (born 1974), Nigerian football defender
 Temple West (1714–1757), British admiral
 Timothy West (born 1934), British actor
 Thomas West (disambiguation), also Tom West, several people
 Togo D. West Jr. (1942–2018), African-American attorney
 Vita Sackville-West (1892–1962), English poet, novelist and gardener
 Wallace West (1900–1980), American science fiction writer
 Walter West (disambiguation), several people
 Will West Long (c. 1869–1947), Cherokee mask maker, a translator, and a Cherokee cultural historian
 William West (disambiguation), several people

Fictional characters 
 Herbert West, a character in the works of H. P. Lovecraft
 Honey West, a fictional detective in the works of G. G. Fickling
 Iris West, a character in DC Comics
 Josh West, a character in the Australian soap opera Home and Away
 Nathan West, a character in the American soap opera General Hospital
 Agent Orin West, a character from the DC Animated Universe
 Sherri West, a District Attorney, appearing on Law & Order: Special Victims Unit
 Wallace West (character), a character in DC Comics
 Wally West, a DC Comics superhero known for being the first Kid Flash and third Flash
 Jade West, a character in the Victorious

See also 
 Baron West

English-language surnames